is the largest coral reef group in Japan, containing over 100 coral reefs and spanning about 17 by 6.5 km. Known for being above water level several times a year, most visibly around March 3, it was made a Natural Monument of Japan in 2013 as a place of Scenic Beauty. It is located about 6 km off the northern coast of Ikema Island.

Ecology
The reef contains about 300 kinds of coral.

Conservation history
The Ministry of the Environment has designated the reef as one of the 500 most important wetlands in Japan. In 2018, it was discovered that the living part of the reef had decreased by about 70% since 2008 from coral bleaching, due to rising water temperatures.

References

Coral reefs
Ryukyu Islands
Natural monuments of Japan